Scott Township, Nebraska may refer to the following places:

 Scott Township, Buffalo County, Nebraska
 Scott Township, Holt County, Nebraska

See also

Scott Township (disambiguation)

Nebraska township disambiguation pages